Rhodaliidae is a family of siphonophores.  In Japanese they are called .

Rhodaliids have a characteristic gas-secreting structure called aurophore.  Below the enlarged pneumatophore (float), the siphosome and nectosome are contracted into a complex.  Rhodaliids have a benthic lifestyle and use their tentacles to attach themselves to the seafloor.

Genera and species
Rhodaliidae contains the following subtaxa:
Angelopsis Fewkes, 1886
Angelopsis euryale Pugh, 1983
Angelopsis globosa Fewkes, 1886
Arancialia Hissmann, 2005
Arancialia captonia Hissmann, 2005
Archangelopsis Lens & van Riemsdijk, 1908
Archangelopsis jagoa Hissmann, Schauer & Pugh, 1995
Archangelopsis typica Lens & van Riemsdijk, 1908
Dendrogramma Just, Kristensen & Olesen, 2014
Dendrogramma enigmatica Just, Kristensen & Olesen, 2014
Dromalia Bigelow, 1911
Dromalia alexandri Bigelow, 1911
Rhodalia Haeckel, 1888
Rhodalia miranda Haeckel, 1888
Steleophysema Moser, 1924
Steleophysema aurophora Moser, 1924
Stephalia Haeckel, 1888
Stephalia bathyphysa (Haeckel, 1888)
Stephalia corona Haeckel, 1888
Stephalia dilata (Bigelow, 1911)
Thermopalia Pugh, 1983
Thermopalia taraxaca Pugh, 1983
Tridensa Hissmann, 2005
Tridensa rotunda Hissmann, 2005
Tridensa sulawensis Hissmann, 2005

References

Further reading
Pugh, P. R. (1983). Benthic Siphonophores: A Review of the Family Rhodaliidae (Siphonophora, Physonectae). Philosophical Transactions of the Royal Society B: Biological Sciences. 301(1105): 165-300. (look up in IMIS), available online at https://doi.org/10.1098/rstb.1983.0025

 
Physonectae
Cnidarian families
Taxa named by Ernst Haeckel